Conus richardbinghami is a species of sea snail, a marine gastropod mollusk in the family Conidae, the cone snails and their allies.

Like all species within the genus Conus, these snails are predatory and venomous. They are capable of "stinging" humans, therefore live ones should be handled carefully or not at all.

The specific name richardbinghami is in honor of Richard Bingham.

Distribution
This marine species occurs off the Bahamas.

Description
The maximum recorded shell length is 35 mm.

Habitat
Minimum recorded depth is 1 m. Maximum recorded depth is 20 m.

References

 Tucker J.K. & Tenorio M.J. (2009) Systematic classification of Recent and fossil conoidean gastropods. Hackenheim: Conchbooks. 296 pp.
 Puillandre N., Duda T.F., Meyer C., Olivera B.M. & Bouchet P. (2015). One, four or 100 genera? A new classification of the cone snails. Journal of Molluscan Studies. 81: 1–23

External links
 Conus Biodiversity 
 Cone Shells - Knights of the Sea
 

richardbinghami
Gastropods described in 1993